The Peruvian version of Bailando por un Sueño premiered its first season on June 7, 2008, hosted by Gisela Valcárcel, who returned to Peruvian television after spending three years away. The programs, in a format called "galas", transmitted on Saturdays at 10 pm (-5 GMT) for Panamericana Television live from the Monitor Studios, located in the Lima district of San Borja.

Concept and schedule
Bailando por un Sueño is a reality show where 13 participants called "The Dreamers" star in a dance competition in which the winner will realize a dream that becomes public knowledge, either to resolve a personal problem or to help someone else. The program focuses on social assistance that can be provided to talented people who have no economic means to achieve certain goals and comply with the tool that these dreamers have to overcome adversity is his talent for dancing.

The "dreamers" are not alone in his company, each of which receives the aid or support of a famous person or "hero", which make up a pair of dancers. The "dreamers" are 13 ordinary people who were chosen after passing a rigorous audition, and are a common feature special talent for dance and have dramatic stories of personal need or altruistic goals for their community. On the other hand, or the famous "heroes" are celebrities from the entertainment and sports world, most of whom had no prior preparation for the dance event and were offered voluntarily or were summoned by Gisela Valcárcel to help each "dreamer" to achieve the realization of his dream.

The thirteen couples (dreamer and hero) will compete over 12 weekly galas, which will eliminate those couples who by the score awarded by the jury are sentenced and received the fewest votes from viewers telephone. At the final gala will be competitions by two couples who get the long-awaited fulfilment of his dream, as well as an award from surprise Cerveza Cristal.

The four couples who succeed in reaching the top ranks of the First Season will participate in November 2008 in the "Kings of the Dancefloor" along with the three couples highlights of the second season (which began in late August), plus of that couple to occupy the best 4th place in the first two seasons as the score given by judges. The dreamer of the couple receiving the first of this tournament will win a prize of 100,000 soles, and next to the famous who will be accompanying him to represent Peru at the Second International Dance Championship, which will possibly take place in Argentina in 2009.

"Bailando por un Sueño" is part of prime time Saturday of Panamericana Television, is transmitted from 10:00 pm, lasting about two and a half hours, and includes the transmission of micro daily from Monday to Friday along the regular programming of this television channel, which began in the weeks before the gala premiere of the first and whose purpose is to keep the public abreast of the trials of participants as well as reporting on couples "sentenced" to the public can save by voting through telephone calls or text messages (In the first week of micro reported on the casting process that ended with the selection of the 13 "dreamers").

Gisela Valcárcel, formerly known as "The queen of Noon," is a risk in investing huge amount of money so far not revealed to buy the license from "Dancing for a Dream," perhaps the most successful franchise of Televisa, which traveled to Mexico to personally contact with its creators Santiago and Ruben Galindo. Against all odds, his newly founded company GV Productions managed to acquire a license, besides having the right of first refusal to acquire an additional five programs Televisa if the program succeeded in achieving success. Panamericana Television, the TV station that transmits the program only provides its signal and some technical equipment through Panam Content, which also is responsible for conducting, but is not involved in any aspect of production and creative content, which is managed by SAC GV Productions, under the baton of the producer and Ricky Rodriguez Gisela the same.

First season
The first season of "Bailando por un sueño" was launched on Saturday, June 7, 2008 with prognosis reserved by the critics, even as it recalled the reasons which led to his driver, Gisela Valcárcel, to leave the television three years before. But the show was a success since its first broadcast, leading to dethrone "Fares Laughter," a comical nature of sexist and vulgar that it had been the leader of tune on weekends for many years. Although this was only saying that it was a fad and that soon they would run the streak, "Dancing for a Dream" in his first season continued as the absolute leader of tune on weekends, except in two specific nights When transmitted from the playoffs for the world of 2010 between the selections of Peru and Colombia as a channel of competition showed a special tribute to Mexican comic Chespirito, who was then in Lima presenting its drama "11 and 12 "with overwhelming success.

Jury
 Joaquin Vargas (Theatre director, Television producer and director of the new virtual version of Nubeluz)
 Teddy Guzmán (theater Actress and television)
 Carlos Cacho (Make-up artist for television and Host)
 Pachi Valle Riestra (professional dancer)

Famous and Dreamers

Second season

The Second Season of Dancing for a Dream was launched on August 30 and culminate on November 15, 2008. In the opinion of critics and the public, couples this season have a competitive level higher than in the previous season and it is not clear who may be the favorites.

Jury
 Joaquin Vargas (Theatre director, Television producer and director of the new virtual version of Nubeluz)
 Morella Petrozzi (professional dancer)
 Carlos Cacho (Make-up artist for television and Host)
 Pachi Valle Riestra (professional dancer)

Famous and Dreamers
Famous  -->  Occupation -->  Dreamer

Mónica Sánchez      -->    Actress                       -->  Alex Petricek
Montserrat Brugué    -->    Actress                       -->  Darren Morán
Marco Antonio	     -->    Stylist                       -->  Eileen Cabrera
Celine Aguirre      -->    Actress / Psychologist / Host -->  Nicholas Tineo
Delly Madrid        -->    Model                         -->  José Luis Campos
Percy Olivares      -->    Ex-Footballer                 -->  Cecilia Reyes
Marco Zunino        -->    Actor                         -->  Jardena Ugaz
Norka Ramírez       -->    Actress                       -->  Nahun Osorio
Gustavo Mayer       -->    Actor                         -->  Viviana Guerrero Viviana Guerrero
Bárbara Cayo        -->    Actress / Singer              -->  Henry Ladines
Javier Valdés       -->    Actor                         -->  Erica Chasi
Pold Gastello       -->    Actor                         -->  Mónica Astacio
María Angélica Vega -->    Actress                       -->  Henry Otoya

References

Peruvian reality television series
2008 Peruvian television series debuts
2000s Peruvian television series
2010s Peruvian television series
Panamericana Televisión original programming